Toad Data Modeler is a database design tool allowing users to visually create, maintain, and document new or existing database systems, and to deploy changes to data structures across different platforms. It is used to construct logical and physical data models, compare and synchronize models, generate complex SQL/DDL, create and modify scripts, and reverse and forward engineer databases and data warehouse systems. Toad's data modelling software is used for database design, maintenance and documentation.

Product History 
Toad Data Modeler was previously called "CASE Studio 2" before it was acquired from Charonware by Quest Software in 2006. Quest Software was acquired by Dell on September 28, 2012. On October 31, 2016, Dell finalized the sale of Dell Software to Francisco Partners and Elliott Management, which relaunched on November 1, 2016 as Quest Software.

Features/Usages 
 Multiple database support - Connect multiple databases natively and simultaneously, including Oracle, SAP, MySQL, SQL Server, PostgreSQL, Db2, Ingres, and Microsoft Access.
  Data modelling tool - Create database structures or make changes to existing models automatically and provide documentation on multiple platforms.
 Logical and physical modelling - Build complex logical and physical entity relationship models and reverse, forward, and engineer databases.
 Reporting - Generate detailed reports on existing database structures.
 Model customization - Add logical data to user diagrams to customize user models.
All Toad products typically have 2 releases per year.

Other features
 Model Actions (Compare Models, Convert Model, Merge Models, Generate Change Script)
 Version Control System (Apache Subversion)
 Naming Conventions
 Auto Layout
 Multiple Workspaces
 Scripting and Customization
 Automation
 Object Gallery
 Full Unicode Support
 Integration with Toad for Oracle

Related Software 
Erwin Data Modeler
Oracle
 SAP
 MySQL
 SQL Server
 PostgreSQL
 IBM Db2
 Ingres
 Microsoft Access

See also
 Comparison of data modeling tools
 Relational Model
 Data modeling
 RDBMS

References

External links

Programming tools
Desktop database application development tools
Data modeling tools
2000s software
Oracle database tools
Microsoft database software
Sybase
MySQL